The Iñupiaq language has a vigesimal (base-20) numeral system. Numerals are built from a small number of root words and a number of compounding suffixes. The following list are the various numerals of the language, omitting only the higher derivatives ending in the suffix , which subtracts one from the value of the stem. (See Iñupiaq language#Numerals.) They are transcribed both in the vigesimal Kaktovik digits that were designed for Iñupiaq and in the decimal Hindu-Arabic digits. Apart from the subtractive suffix , which has no counterpart in Kaktovik notation, and the idiosyncratic root word  'six', Iñupiaq numerals are closely represented by the Kaktovik digits.

References

Numerals
Inupiat language